The Saxon Class VIb  were four-coupled, tender locomotives in express train service with the Royal Saxon State Railways. In 1925, the Deutsche Reichsbahn grouped these engines into DRG Class 34.8.

History 
The Saxon Class VIb V locomotives were built from 1889 onwards in a total of 14 units by the Hartmann and were designed for hauling express trains. They were mostly retired by 1922. The Reichsbahn took over just one engine and gave it the running number 34 8011. It was retired in 1925.

Technical features 
These locomotives were the first compound locomotives in Saxony. Its two-cylinder, compound engine was located behind the carrying axle and drove the final axle. The locomotives had an inside Allan valve gear. The steam dome was in the centre of the boiler over the middle axle. The running gear had an improved Nowotny carrying axle, nevertheless it did not have good riding qualities. The Schleifer brakes were later converted to Westinghouse brakes.

See also
Royal Saxon State Railways
List of Saxon locomotives and railbuses

References 

 
 

2-4-0 locomotives
06b V
Sächsische Maschinenfabrik locomotives
Railway locomotives introduced in 1889
Standard gauge locomotives of Germany
1′B n2v locomotives
Passenger locomotives